Emma Lavinia Gifford (24 November 1840 – 27 November 1912) was an English writer and suffragist, who was the first wife of the novelist and poet Thomas Hardy.

Early life
Emma Gifford was born in Plymouth, Devon, on 24 November 1840 The second youngest of five children, her father was John Attersoll Gifford, a solicitor, and she was named after her mother, Emma (Farman) Gifford. Emma's father retired early and relied on his mother's private income, so when her grandmother died in 1860, the family had to make economies and moved to a cheaper, rented house in Bodmin, Cornwall. Emma and her elder sister Helen had to work as governesses, and Helen became an unpaid companion to a woman in whose home she met her husband, the Reverend Caddell Holder. Emma joined her in 1868 to help with housekeeping and to run the parish.

Marriage
Emma Gifford met the writer Thomas Hardy in 1870 when he was working as an architect. Hardy had been commissioned to prepare a report on the condition of St Julitta's, the parish church of St Juliot, near Boscastle in Cornwall. Their courtship inspired A Pair of Blue Eyes, Hardy's third novel. They did not marry until four years later on 17 September 1874 at St Peter's Church, Paddington, London. The ceremony was conducted by Emma's uncle, Edwin Hamilton Gifford, canon of Worcester Cathedral and later archdeacon of London. The Hardys had a honeymoon in Rouen and Paris. Given Thomas Hardy's comparatively humble origins, Emma "regarded herself as her husband's social superior, and in later life would make embarrassing references in public to the gap in class that existed between them".

Later life
The Hardys were never able to have children, which may have affected their relationship. It was observed that the couple did not get on with each other; A. C. Benson noted, "It gave me a sense of something intolerable the thought of his having to live day and night with the absurd, inconsequent, huffy, rambling old lady. They don't get on together at all. The marriage was thought a misalliance for her, when he was poor and undistinguished, and she continues to resent it.... He (Hardy) is not agreeable to her either, but his patience must be incredibly tried. She is so queer, and yet has to be treated as rational, while she is full, I imagine, of suspicions and jealousies and affronts which must be half insane"; a frequent visitor to the household, Evelyn Evans, said Emma Hardy "was considered very odd by the townspeople of Dorchester.... Her delusions of grandeur grew more marked. Never forgetting that she was an archdeacon's niece who had married beneath her ... she persuaded embarrassed editors to publish her worthless poems, and intimated that she was the guiding spirit of all Hardy's work"; Christine Wood Homer, a friend of the Hardys, said Emma "had the fixed idea that she was the superior of her husband in birth, education, talents, and manners. She could not, and never did, recognise his greatness.... Whereas at first she had only been childish, with advancing age she became very queer and talked curiously."

After twenty years of marriage, Thomas Hardy published Jude the Obscure, controversial for its portrayal of Victorian religion, sexual mores and marriage. Emma disapproved of Hardy's last novel because of the book's criticisms of religion and because he worried that the reading public would believe the relationship between Jude and Sue paralleled her strained relationship with Hardy. Emma and Hardy spent more and more time apart, and he began seeing other women, such as Florence Dugdale, companion to Lady Stoker, sister-in-law of Bram Stoker, author of Dracula. Hardy portrays Florence in various poems such as "On the Departure Platform". In 1899, Emma became a virtual recluse and spent much of her time in attic rooms, which 

he asked Thomas Hardy to build for her and she called "my sweet refuge and solace".

Women's suffrage

An active suffragist and supporter of women's suffrage, in 1907 Emma Hardy joined George Bernard Shaw and his wife in a march in London.

Death
 
Emma Hardy died at Max Gate, the house she shared with Hardy near Dorchester on 27 November 1912 at the age of 72. On 26 November, she had felt unwell and allowed a doctor to visit but not to examine her. At 8 am on 27 November, her maid found Emma "moaning and terribly ill". The maid summoned the cook, who attempted to carry her down the staircase, but by the time Hardy had been called, he found her unconscious, and she died shortly afterwards. The doctor gave the cause of death as heart failure and impacted gallstones. She was buried three days later at the church of St Michael, Stinsford, Dorset. Thomas Hardy had a wreath inscribed "From her lonely husband, with the Old Affection."

Satires of Circumstance, Thomas Hardy's fourth book of verse, includes The Poems of 1912–13, a collection of poems written immediately following Emma's death. Hardy found a notebook titled "What I Think of My Husband" in her attic bedroom and spent the rest of his life regretting the unhappiness he had caused her.

Some Recollections, and other writings
Emma was an occasional writer throughout her life, working for example on her (unpublished) short story "The Maid on the Shore" during her engagement to Hardy. In later life, she wrote what Ford Madox Ford described as "her own innocuous poems", such as "The Trumpet Call (to the single Daffodil)" [1910] as well as prose poems which she published privately as Spaces in 1912.

After Emma's death, Thomas Hardy discovered a book bound in brown paper, made from the pages of exercise books and stitched together with red thread. The title was Some Recollections by E. L. Hardy and the last page was headed 4 January 1911. The manuscript covered Emma's early life, up to the time of her marriage. Thomas Hardy included part of it in his autobiography The Early Life of Thomas Hardy, in pages 88–96. The whole of it was edited by Evelyn Hardy and Robert Gittings and published with "some relevant poems by Thomas Hardy" in 1961; a revised edition was published in 1979.

Unsophisticated in style, and genial in spirit, Recollections makes plain Emma's early zest for life, and her uncomplicated enjoyment of what it had to offer.  Musical evenings with her family; parties and balls, with "Splendid sashes and stockings and shoes...and very graceful and light and airy we all looked in them"; horse-riding on her mare Fanny, "scampering up and down the hills on my beloved mare...my hair floating on the wind"; and the Cornish scenery, "with its magnificent waves and spray, its white gulls and black choughs and grey puffins, its cliffs and rocks and gorgeous sunsettings": all are recalled in a lively way that explains Hardy's early fascination with her, and on which he drew decades later when he immortalised her in his Poems 1912–13.

References

External links

 Portrait of Emma Gifford aged 30 (at Dorset County Museum) 
 Paintings of Dorset by Emma Lavinia Hardy (Art UK)

1840 births
1912 deaths
19th-century English women writers
20th-century English women writers
Burials in Dorset
English suffragists
Thomas Hardy
Writers from Plymouth, Devon